Jean-Jacques Bouchard (30 October 1606, in Paris – 26 August 1641, in Rome) was a French writer. He was the son of Jean Bouchard, Secretary of the King, and Claude Merceron, a relation of Gilles Ménage, from a recently ennobled family composed of judges. Bouchard was an author of erotic literature and notably published Confessions.

Main works
 La Conjuration du comte de Fiesque, traduite de l'italien du Sgr Mascardi par le Sr de Fontenay Sainte-Geneviève et dédiée à Monseigneur l'Éminentissime Cardinal Duc de Richelieu, Paris, 1639
 Journal I Les confessions ; Voyage de Paris à Rome ; Le carnaval à Rome, works by Jean-Jacques Bouchard, by Emanuele Kanceff, Turin, Giappichelli, 1976
 Journal II Voyage dans le royaume de Naples ; Voyage dans la campagne de Rome, works by Jean-Jacques Bouchard, by Emanuele Kanceff, Turin, Giappichelli, 1977
 Confessions, preceded by "Avez-vous lu Bouchard ?" by Patrick Mauriès, Paris, le Promeneur, 2003

Bibliography
 René Pintard, Le Libertinage érudit dans la première moitié du XVIIe siècle, Paris, Boivin, 1943, Slatkine reed., 2000

References

External links
 

1606 births
1641 deaths
Writers from Paris
French erotica writers
17th-century French writers
17th-century French male writers